The Piaskower Synagoge is a former synagogue in Białystok, Podlaskie Voivodeship, Poland, on 3 Piękna street in the Piaski district, from which it takes its name.

The synagogue was constructed from 1891 to 1893 on the site of an earlier wooden synagogue which had been built around 1820. During the German occupation of Poland in the Second World War, it was partially destroyed. From 1945 to 1968, it was the seat of various Białystok Jewish organisations, such as the Socio-cultural Association of Jews in Poland. From 1968, the building was no longer used for specifically Jewish purposes, instead being used as a cinema and a theatre. Renovation work in the 1970s removed the distinctive features that marked it as a synagogue and it burnt down in 1989.

In 1995, the structure was renovated. It is currently the headquarters of the Ludwik Zamenhof Foundation, which sells text-books and literature on Esperanto and offers Esperanto language courses.

References

External links 

 Description of the Synagogue on Virtual Shtetl

Esperanto
Former synagogues in Poland
Jews and Judaism in Białystok
Objects of cultural heritage in Poland
Buildings and structures in Białystok
Synagogues completed in 1893
Esperanto organizations
19th-century religious buildings and structures in Poland